Adrian Hearn (16 March 1920 – 18 October 1993) is a former Australian rules footballer who played for the Carlton Football Club and Fitzroy Football Club in the Victorian Football League (VFL).

Notes

External links 

Adrian Hearn's profile at Blueseum

1920 births
Carlton Football Club players
Fitzroy Football Club players
Australian rules footballers from Victoria (Australia)
1993 deaths